Ginninderra Creek, a partly perennial stream of the Murrumbidgee catchment within the Murray–Darling basin, is located in the Capital Country region spanning both the Australian Capital Territory and New South Wales, Australia.

Ginninderra is derived from the Aboriginal word, meaning "sparkling" or "throwing little rays of light". The traditional custodians of the land surrounding Ginninderra Creek are the Aboriginal people of the Ngunnawal tribe.

Course
Ginninderra Creek rises on the northern border between the Australian Capital Territory (ACT) and New South Wales (NSW), sourced from the Spring Range, located north-east of Hall. The creek flows generally south-west across the Ginninderra Plain, through the Gungahlin and Belconnen regions in Canberra, and then heads west crossing the western border between the ACT and flowing into NSW, towards its confluence with the Murrumbidgee River. The creek descends  over its  course.

Ginninderra Creek is impounded by Gungahlin Pond and Lake Ginninderra, a man-made lake that was constructed in 1974 to act as a sedimentation pond. The creek flows over the Ginninderra Falls, descending , and through Ginninderra Gorge, to its confluence with the Murrumbidgee River.

The Ginninderra Creek catchment carries approximately a quarter of Canberra's urban runoff, and there is considerable risk of runoff from urban areas harming aquatic ecosystems in the Murrumbidgee River system.

Recreation
Ginninderra Falls was a popular scenic tourist destination, opened initially as a private tourist park from the late 1990s. John Gale argued that the Ginninderra Falls were so pretty that Canberra should be chosen as the capital city of Australia, rather than the proposal to choose Dalgety as the location for the national capital. From mid-2011 onwards, advocacy began for the establishment of a national park containing the Ginninderra Falls, comprising  and covering both ACT and NSW, inclusive of the existing  Woodstock Nature Reserve in the ACT.

References

External links

 Ginninderra Catchment Group
 Water Watch Results
 A Proposal for a Murrumbidgee – Ginninderra Gorges National Park website

 
 

Rivers of the Australian Capital Territory
Rivers of New South Wales
Tributaries of the Murrumbidgee River